The Vulture Wally is a 1940 German drama film directed by Hans Steinhoff and starring Heidemarie Hatheyer, Sepp Rist and Eduard Köck.

It was shot on location in the Tyrol. The film is based on a popular novel which has been adapted for the screens several times.

Cast

See also
The Vulture Wally (1921)
La Leggenda di Wally (1930)
La Wally (1932, based on the opera)
The Vulture Wally (1956)

References

External links

Films of Nazi Germany
German drama films
1940 drama films
Films directed by Hans Steinhoff
Films set in the Alps
Mountaineering films
Remakes of German films
Sound film remakes of silent films
Tobis Film films
Films scored by Nico Dostal
German black-and-white films
1940s sports films
1940s German-language films
1940s German films